Crossroads School may refer to:

 Crossroads School (Santa Monica, California), in Santa Monica, California
 Crossroads College Preparatory School, a college preparatory school, founded in 1974, for 7th to 12th grade in St. Louis, Missouri
 Crossroads School (Irmo), in Irmo, South Carolina